Inergy, L.P. is an American supplier of propane based in Kansas City, Missouri that claims to be the fourth-largest propane retailer in the United States. Serving 800,000 customers in 28 states.  It is also a major salt miner via its U.S. Salt LLC subsidiary with its salt caverns later being used for natural gas storage.

It was founded in 1998 by its current president and CEO John J. Sherman after he sold his start up propane marketing company LPG Services Group to Dynegy.  As of November 2010, the company had acquired 89 businesses – mostly regional and local propane distributors.

It operates 28 states and employs approximately 3,000 associates and has 700,000 customers. .

In August 2010 it acquired its parent Inergy Holdings which had also traded on the New York Stock Exchange under the ticker symbol NRGP in a deal valued at $2 billion with the resulting company being reported to be worth $6 billion.  Prior to the acquisition both companies shared the same offices in Kansas City.

Midstream operations
Its midstream operations include 
Tres Palacios Gas Storage, Matagorda County, Texas adjacent to the Eagle Ford Formation which has  of working gas
Steuben Gas Storage, Steuben County, New York,  of gas storage
Thomas Corners Gas Storage Steuben County, New York,  of storage
Finger Lakes LPG Storage, Steuben County with  LPG storage and Watkins Glen, New York facility  of LPG storage.
U.S. Salt Gas Storage Development, Watkins Glen,  of natural gas storage capacity in salt caverns.
Stagecoach Storage -  of storage in the Marcellus Formation
U.S. Salt LLC Operations, Watkins Glen on Seneca Lake, New York - sells  of salt each year  and has  of cavern capacity for gas

Retail propane services
The company has purchased various regional or local propane operations which continue to operate under their original names including:

Arrow Gas
Blue Flame
Blue Ridge Propane
Blu-Gas
Bradley Propane
Burnwell Gas
Country Gas
Delta Propane
Dowdle Gas
Eastside Gas
Farm & Home Oil Company
Gaylord Gas
Hancock Gas Service
Highland Propane
Homestead Propane
Hoosier Propane
Independent Propane Company
Jenkins Gas
Legacy Propane
Liberty Propane
Maingas
McCracken Propane
MGS Propane
Modern Gas
Moulton Gas Service
Northwest Energy
Ohio Gas and Appliance
Pearl Gas
Pennington Gas Service
Permagas
ProGas
Pyrofax Energy
Rocky Mountain Propane
Shirley Bottle Gas
Silgas
Southeast Propane
Tru-Gas
United Propane
Yates Gas

References

External links
inergylp.com

Energy companies of the United States
Natural gas companies of the United States
Energy in Missouri
Companies based in Kansas City, Missouri
Energy companies established in 1998
Non-renewable resource companies established in 1998
Companies listed on the New York Stock Exchange
Propane